eSSH Client is a multi task client that supports many different protocols, such as SSH, SFTP, FTP, FTPS, SCP, and RExec. It also supports FTP over SSL. eSSH Client has a rich GUI design that allows multiple access channels at the same time, and has an internal window design that allows all the connections to be viewed from within a main window. It also has a tabbed Secure Shell window with named sessions.

eSSH Client supports proxies, SOCKS4 and SOCKS5, port forwarding, X11 forwarding, encryption management, password and public key authentication, key pair generation, profile management, host key management, different screen emulations for secure shell, and an easy to use GUI. eSSH Client also has an integrated editor that allows to securely edit files on a remote server. it allows docking of a secure shell window to the editor for ease of use. This software is available in North America, Europe, Australia, New Zealand and Japan only.

It is possible to download an evaluation version, however the program needs to be purchased.

Cryptographic software
Internet Protocol based network software